Ilya Aleksandrovich Pomazun (born 16 August 1996) is a Russian football player who plays as a goalkeeper for Ural Yekaterinburg on loan from PFC CSKA Moscow.

Career

Club
After first being included on PFC CSKA Moscow roster in March 2012 at the age of 15, Pomazun made his debut in the Russian Premier League for the club on 6 August 2017 in a game against FC Rubin Kazan, due to an injury to the first-choice goalkeeper Igor Akinfeev.

In the 2018–19 UEFA Champions League group stage 1–0 victory over defending champions Real Madrid, starting goalkeeper Igor Akinfeev was sent off for complaining. Pomazun was injured for that game, so Georgi Kyrnats was substituted to replace Akinfeev. On the next Champions League game day on 23 October 2018, when Akinfeev was serving his disqualification, Pomazun started the away game against Roma which CSKA lost 0–3.

On 5 August 2020, he extended his CSKA contract throughout the 2024–25 season and joined FC Ural Yekaterinburg on loan for the 2020–21 season. On 25 February 2021, his loan was cut short and Pomazun returned to CSKA.

On 9 June 2021, he extended his contract with CSKA until the end of the 2025–26 season and joined Ural on loan once again, for the 2021–22 season.

On 16 June 2022, Pomazun extended his CSKA contract until 2027 and returned to Ural on loan for the 2022–23 season.

International
Pomazun was called up to the Russia national football team for the first time in March 2023 for a training camp.

Personal life
Pomazun's father, Oleksandr Pomazun, played as a goalkeeper, representing Ukraine internationally before re-settling in Russia.

Career statistics

Club

References

External links
 

1996 births
Sportspeople from Kaliningrad
Russian people of Ukrainian descent
Living people
Russian footballers
Russia under-21 international footballers
Association football goalkeepers
PFC CSKA Moscow players
FC Ural Yekaterinburg players
Russian Premier League players